Coleman Richard Hell (born April 25, 1989) is a Canadian musician from Thunder Bay, Ontario. He released his debut single, "2 Heads", in February 2015. His debut full-length album, Summerland, was released on October 14, 2016, by Columbia Records.

Career
After moving to Toronto, Coleman Hell released a free mixtape called Stark Raving followed by the VENA EP.

On October 23, 2015, he released a self-titled six track EP, including the song "2 Heads". He also founded the Toronto-based artist collective Sideways, which includes La+ch, Shan Vincent De Paul and Michah.

He toured with Robert DeLong in 2015, and Twenty One Pilots in 2016.

His debut album, Summerland, was released on October 14, 2016.

On October 15, 2021, Hell announced his upcoming second studio album, Topanga.

Discography

Albums
Summerland (2016, Columbia) (No. 13 in Canada)
Topanga (2021, 604)

EPs
VENA (2014, 604)
Coleman Hell (2015, Columbia) (No. 49 in Canada)

Singles

Promotional singles

References

1989 births
Living people
Canadian male singer-songwriters
Canadian singer-songwriters
Columbia Records artists
Musicians from Thunder Bay
21st-century Canadian male singers